Trial practice is an upper-level course offered in most American law schools designed to teach future litigators the fine points of presenting a case to a judge and jury. Unlike most law school courses, a trial practice class has very little discussion of substantive law, and is focused on the practical application of public speaking, narrative, and using body language to communicate a particular set of events to the triers of fact. Trial practice also contains elements of strategy, teaching students how to decide the order in which witnesses should testify, when exhibits should be introduced, and how to trap opposing witnesses into giving testimony that damages their side.

Evidence is the area of substantive law most reinforced by a trial practice course, with students learning how to apply evidence law in a real-life setting, including learning when they can object to questions asked of witnesses, what objections to raise, and how to effectively present objections.

Trial practice courses may have a classroom component.  Also, trial practice courses will usually have an ongoing "lab" component where an attorney will instruct a small group of students on trial skills and assist them in honing their craft. Often, students practice against one another in mock trials throughout the course; for example, students may be divided into groups of 4, with each group containing two teams who practice against one another in mock trials. 

Rather than a final exam, the course may culminate in a mock trial with volunteer "witnesses".

Legal education